Geoffrey Mapp (born 6 April 1959) is a Barbadian cricketer. He played in one List A match for the Barbados cricket team in 1984/85.

See also
 List of Barbadian representative cricketers

References

External links
 

1959 births
Living people
Barbadian cricketers
Barbados cricketers
People from Saint George, Barbados